Kodes and its accented variances may refer to:

People
Kodeš, a Czech and Slovak name, list of persons with the surname
Kodes (French rapper) (born 1997), French rapper originating from the Martinique

Other
 Kodes, a peak in the Sierra de Codés, Spain

See also
Kode (disambiguation)
Kodesh (disambiguation)